The Scripps National Spelling Bee (formerly the Scripps Howard National Spelling Bee and commonly called the National Spelling Bee) is an annual spelling bee held in the United States.  The competition began in 1925, and was initially organized by The Courier-Journal of Louisville, Kentucky, until the Scripps Howard Broadcasting Company (now the E. W. Scripps Company) assumed sponsorship in 1941.  Every speller in the competition has previously participated in a local spelling bee, usually organized by a local newspaper.

The first champion was Frank Neuhauser of Louisville, who beat eight other finalists to win the inaugural competition.  He was honored with a parade in his hometown, where and when he was presented with bouquets of gladioli in commemoration of the winning word "gladiolus", and returned to the Bee a number of times as a guest of honor.  The first girl to win was Pauline Bell, also of Louisville, the following year.  Girls won nine consecutive competitions from 1932 to 1940.  Joint winners have been crowned on seven occasions in the Bee's history. The first such occurrence was in 1950, when Dean Colquitt and Diana Reynard were declared co-champions after the contestants had exhausted the list of available words.  In both 1957 and 1962 joint champions were declared when both remaining contestants spelled the same word incorrectly. After three consecutive ties between 2014 and 2016, a written tiebreaker round was introduced, but it was discontinued for the 2019 Bee, which subsequently resulted in an unprecedented eight-way tie when the organizers ended the final session after the remaining contestants had completed five consecutive perfect rounds.

Although the competition is titled "National", it is not restricted to spellers from the United States.  In 1975 Hugh Tosteson García of San Juan, Puerto Rico was the first winner from outside the mainland United States.  In 1998, Jody-Anne Maxwell from Jamaica became the first speller from outside the US to win the Bee, as well as the first black winner.  In recent decades the competition has been dominated by Indian-American students.  Although people of South Asian origin make up less than one percent of the U.S. population, the vast majority of the winners since 1999, including all fourteen champions between 2008–2018 and seven of the eight co-champions in 2019, have come from the Indian-American community.  One such speller, Nihar Janga from Austin, Texas, became the youngest champion in the Bee's history when he won the title in 2016 at the age of 11. The 93rd Scripps National Spelling Bee was the first time that an African-American (Zaila Avant-garde) became the champion and only the second time that the champion was a black person.

The competition was not held from 1943 to 1945 because of World War II. The 2020 competition was canceled due to concerns about the COVID-19 pandemic.

Champions

References

External links
 spellingbee.com, the official website of the Scripps National Spelling Bee

Scripps National
Scripps National

Scripps National